Daniel Munro (2 March 1887 – ?) was a Scottish footballer who played as a winger for Celtic, Bradford Park Avenue, Port Vale, and Clydebank.

Career
Munro began his career at Forres Mechanics, before he joined Celtic in 1907. He signed with Bradford Park Avenue in October 1910, and became a first team regular for the Second Division side. He joined Port Vale in the summer of 1914, and made his debut at outside-right in a 3–1 win over Everton Reserves in a Central League match at the Athletic Ground on 1 September 1914. He was released at the end of the 1914–15 season as the club went into abeyance due to World War I. He later played for Clydebank.

Career statistics
Source:

References

1887 births
People from Peterhead
Footballers from Aberdeenshire
Scottish footballers
Forres Mechanics F.C. players
Association football outside forwards
Celtic F.C. players
Bradford (Park Avenue) A.F.C. players
Port Vale F.C. players
Clydebank F.C. (1914) players
Scottish Football League players
English Football League players
Year of death missing
Highland Football League players